Baltazar Martínez Montemayor (born August 31, 1966) is a Mexican politician from the National Action Party. He serves as a federal deputy of the LXIII Legislature of the Mexican Congress, representing Nuevo León and the second electoral region. He is currently married to Gloria Elizabeth Rios Pruneda and had three sons with her, Baltazar Martínez Rios (The current mayor of Cerralvo) and Joey Martínez Rios (Both born April 10, 1990), and Sebastian Martínez Rios (born September 6, 2000).

Life
After obtaining his degree in business administration from the Universidad Autónoma de Nuevo León in 1987, Martínez founded Grupo Plaza Cerralvo, S.A. de C.V., and was its general administrator from 1992 to 2009. His political career began in the mid-1990s as a town councilor in Cerralvo and in the Human Resources department of the state government of Nuevo León. He joined the PAN in 2001 and began teaching classes to PAN politicians at the national and state levels. He also was the local PAN's secretary of organization from 2000 to 2003 and its municipal-level president from 2004 to 2010.

After a three-year term as a local deputy in the LXXI Legislature of the Congress of Nuevo León, which met from 2006 to 2009, the PAN sent Martínez to the federal Chamber of Deputies for the first time in 2009, for the LXI Legislature. He sat on the Communications, Hydraulic Resources, Tourism, and Special for the Cuenca de Burgos Region Commissions. He also continued to serve as a state- and national-level councilor in the PAN, and after his term as a federal deputy expired, he was named the Chief Clerk of the state congress of Nuevo León.

For the second time, the PAN placed Martínez on its list from the second region, returning Martínez to San Lázaro for the LXIII Legislature. He serves on the Infrastructure, Municipal Development and Hydraulic Resources Commissions; he is also an unused backup senator for the LXI and LXIII Legislatures.

Personal
Martínez Montemayor's son, Baltazar Martínez Ríos, was elected mayor of Cerralvo in 2015, at the age of 25; he is the first PAN mayor in Cerralvo's history and the youngest in Nuevo León. Martínez Montemayor's brother was kidnapped in July 2010 while en route to visit relatives in the United States.

References

1966 births
Living people
Politicians from Nuevo León
Members of the Chamber of Deputies (Mexico) for Nuevo León
National Action Party (Mexico) politicians
21st-century Mexican politicians
Deputies of the LXIII Legislature of Mexico